Muslu Nalbantoğlu (born 24 November 1983) is a Dutch footballer of Turkish descent who plays as a right-back for APWC in the Derde Klasse.

Career
Nalbantoğlu was born in Amersfoort. He made his debut in professional football, being part of the NEC Nijmegen squad in the 2004–05 season. In the 2008–09 season, he transferred to his native country and joined Kayserispor. He was released on 28 October 2008.

In January 2009, he was offered a contract until June 2010 after training with De Graafschap. In the decisive game of the 2009–10 Eerste Divisie season, Nalbantoğlu scored the winning goal in the 3–2 comeback win over Go Ahead Eagles which secured De Graafschap the Eerste Divisie title and promotion to the Eredivisie.

In August 2012, he signed a one-year deal with FC Oss, which was playing in the Eerste Divisie.

On 2 July 2013, Nalbantoğlu signed a two-year contract Orduspor in Turkey. In August, only one month later, he had his contract terminated. On 1 February 2014, Go-Ahead Kampen announced that they had signed Nalbantoğlu. That same day, Nalbantoğlu made his debut against VV Berkum in the Saturday Hoofdklasse C. In June 2014, he moved to AFC Quick 1890. Since 2018, Nalbantoğlu has been playing for his childhood club APWC.

Honours
De Graafschap
 Eerste Divisie: 2009–10

References

External links
 
 Official Website - Muslu Nalbantoğlu
 Player details - Turkish Football Federation

1983 births
Living people
Dutch people of Turkish descent
Sportspeople from Amersfoort
Association football fullbacks
Dutch footballers
Dutch expatriate footballers
USV Elinkwijk players
NEC Nijmegen players
Kayserispor footballers
De Graafschap players
TOP Oss players
Orduspor footballers
Eredivisie players
Eerste Divisie players
Expatriate footballers in Turkey
Footballers from Utrecht (province)
Dutch expatriate sportspeople in Turkey